Charles Gaskell may refer to:

 Charles T. Gaskell (1920–2000), bishop of the Episcopal Diocese of Milwaukee
 Charles Milnes Gaskell (1842–1919), English lawyer and politician